Hendrik Spilman (1721, Amsterdam – 1784, Haarlem), was an 18th-century painter and engraver from the Northern Netherlands.

Biography

According to the RKD he spent his working life in Haarlem, where he enrolled in 1742 as a member of the Haarlem Guild of Saint Luke. He was a pupil of Abraham de Haen, who trained him as a painter and draughtsman, but he is best known for his topographical drawings and engravings of cityscapes and important buildings. He made engravings after drawings by de Haen, Jan de Beijer, Cornelis Pronk, and Cornelis van Noorde in addition to his own work for various publications.

Published works
Het verheerlykt Nederland of Kabinet van Hedendaagsche gezigten. This nine-part work was published between 1745 and 1774 by Isaac Tirion in Amsterdam as an illustration to his Hedendaagsche historie of Tegenwoordige Staat der Vereenigde Nederlanden
Aangenaame Gezichten in de vermakelyke landsdouwen van Haarlem, with engravings by Spilman and van Noorde, 1761
Nederlandsche tafereelen; of eene keurige verzameling van negen honderd fraaije gezigten van steden, dorpen, sloten, oudheden, adelyke huizen, hofsteden, kerken, torens, poorten, gestichten, en veele andere aanzienlyke stads- en landsgebouwen; in en omtrent de zeven vereenigde Nederlandsche provintien, with engravings by Spilman, Pronk, De Beijer, and Adriaen van Swijndrecht, 1792

References

Hendrik Spilman on Artnet

1721 births
1784 deaths
18th-century Dutch painters
18th-century Dutch male artists
Dutch male painters
Dutch engravers
Painters from Haarlem
Painters from Amsterdam